Sir James Anderson (November 1800 – 8 May 1864) was a British politician and manufacturer.

Born at Stirling, he was the son of the merchant John Anderson and his wife Christian Wright. Aged fifteen, he moved to Glasgow to accompany his older brother David. Working in a manufactury, he rose through the city's civic dignities.

Anderson served as a Councillor from 1841 to 1854
and was appointed Lord Provost of Glasgow in 1848 and was created a Knight Bachelor on Queen Victoria's visit in the following year. He held this post until 1851 and entered the British House of Commons in the next year, sitting for Stirling Burghs until 1859.

In 1850 he was living at 3 Blythswood Square.

He married Janet, the only daughter and heiress of Robert Hood, a fellow Bailie of Glasgow Council. The couple had three sons and a daughter. Anderson died, aged 63, at his mansion in Blairvadick in Dumbartonshire.

References

External links

1800 births
1864 deaths
Knights Bachelor
Lord Provosts of Glasgow
Members of the Parliament of the United Kingdom for Scottish constituencies
Politicians awarded knighthoods
UK MPs 1852–1857
UK MPs 1857–1859
Members of the Parliament of the United Kingdom for Stirling constituencies